Elva "Chunchuna" Villafañe (born April 9, 1940) is an Argentine model, actress and architect, born in Buenos Aires, Argentina.

She has appeared in film and television since the year  1971.

Her most well-known role is as Ana in La historia oficial (1985).

Filmography
 Un Guapo del 900 (1971) (aka A Player out of the 1900s)
 No toquen a la nena (1976)
 La historia oficial (1985) as Ana (aka The Official Story)
 Sostenido en La menor (1986) (aka Padre, marido y amante - Argentina)
 time of your mother (1988)
 Nunca estuve en Viena (1989) as Carolina (aka I Never Been in Vienna)
 Algunas mujeres (1992)
 Historia de desiertos (1995)
 Vidas privadas (2001) as Sofía Uranga (aka Privates Lives)
 Micaela, una película mágica (2002) as Micaela's grandmother
 Extraño (2003) as Ana's mother  (aka Strange)
 Cochabanba (2005) as la cocha de la banba  (aka La Cocha)

Television
 Extraños y amantes (1985) TV series as Micaela
 Atreverse (1990) TV series
 El Beso del olvido (1991) (TV)
 Las Amantes (2001) TV series
 Sol negro (2003) (mini) TV mini-series as Andrea Estévez
 Durch Himmel und Hölle (2007) (TV)

Awards
Nominations
 Argentine Film Critics Association Awards: Silver Condor, Best Supporting Actress (Mejor Actriz de Reparto), for Vidas privadas; 2003.

References

External links
 
 

1940 births
Argentine television actresses
Argentine film actresses
Living people
People from Buenos Aires